Qazi in Iran may refer to:

Qazi, Iran, a city in North Khorasan Province
Qaziabad, Dorud, a village in Lorestan Province
Qazi, Garmkhan, a village in North Khorasan Province
Qazi, Gifan, a village in North Khorasan Province
Qazi-ye Bala, a village in Qom Province
Qazi-ye Pain, a village in Qom Province
Qazi Rural District, in North Khorasan Province